Khomeyran (also Romanized as Khomeyrān) is a village in Jirdeh Rural District, in the Central District of Shaft County, Gilan Province, Iran. At the 2006 census, its population was 380, in 90 families.

References 

Populated places in Shaft County